Clasterosphaeria is a genus of fungi in the family Magnaporthaceae.

References

External links 
 

Sordariomycetes genera
Magnaporthales